Band-e Hindukush is a mountain pass in Parwan Province, Afghanistan. It is located west of Parwan and southwest of Salang Pass in Jabal Saraj District. It is several kilometres from the mountain Silsilah ye Koh e Hindukush and Kotal e Hindukush. The pass is one of the highest passes in the country. This region has a dry warm summer.

References

Mountain passes of Afghanistan
Landforms of Parwan Province